Ibrahima Kébé (Kaolack, October 2, 1955 – Dakar, September 8, 2019) was a Senegalese Soninke painter. He lived until his death in Village des Arts de Dakar.

Biography 
Ibrahima Kébé was born in Kaolack, Senegal on October 2, 1955. He was of Sarakhol origin.

Kébé studied at School of Fine Arts in Dakar.

His art focused on everyday life, and he had exhibitions in Senegal, Belgium, and Germany.

He was resident at the Village des Arts in Dakar.

He died on September 8, 2019.

Selection of work 

 Unequal sharing, 1982
The cry of youth, 1983
 Research Notice, 1996
 Woman in power, 1997
 Swimmers, 1998
 Woman with balafon, 1999
 Grouping, 1999
 Affectivity, 1999
 Big family in black and white, 2002
 Grouping of Wise Men, 2004
 The young boy, 2004
 Happy couple, 2004
 Twilight of men, 2004
 Serenity, 2004
 Confidential letter, 2004
 The big kiss, 2004
 The friends of the sun, 2004
 The fiancée du ciel, 2004

References

External links
 Curriculum vitae
 Interview, juillet 2002
 Biographie

1955 births
2019 deaths
Senegalese painters
People from Kaolack
Soninke people
Male painters
20th-century painters
21st-century painters